Dharmakīrtiśrī (Tibetan: Serlingpa; ; , literally "from Suvarnadvīpa"), also known as Kulānta and Suvarṇadvipi Dharmakīrti,  was a renowned 10th century Buddhist teacher remembered as a key teacher of Atiśa. His name refers to the region he lived, somewhere in Lower Burma, the Malay Peninsula or Sumatra.

See also
Lojong

References

Further reading
 Skilling, Peter (1997). Dharmakirti of Suvartabhumi, Journal of the Siam Society 85, 187-194

External links
 Sinklair, Iain (2021). Dharmakirti of Kedah: His Life, Work and Troubled Times. ISEAS, Yusof Ishak Institute

Indonesian scholars of Buddhism
Madhyamaka scholars
10th-century people
10th-century Buddhists